Athetis thoracica is a moth of the  family Noctuidae. It is found all over the Indo-Australian and Pacific tropics. It was first recorded from Hawaii in the early 1900s. It is believed to have been accidentally introduced from Fiji. It is now present on Kauai, Oahu, Molokai, Maui and Hawaii.

Larvae have been recorded on Commelina, Ipomoea, Syzygium, Portulaca,  Nicotiana, Camellia  and unspecified Gramineae and Leguminosae species.

The first instar larvae are about 2 mm long and blackish with prominent setae, they move in semi-Looper fashion. The second instar is mottled reddish green. Later instars are mottled greenish and blackish with some red, and with subdorsal white lines. Instars become progressively darker and more variegated with black brown, olive green, yellow and white.

The pupa is formed in the soil, just below the surface. It is 13–15 mm long and uniform
medium brown. The pupal period lasts for 12 to 14 days.

Taxonomy
The name Athetis nonagrica has been applied consistently to specimens that are in fact the more widespread species Athetis thoracica.

External links
Moths of Borneo

Acronictinae
Moths of Asia
Moths of Oceania